The 5th constituency of Győr-Moson-Sopron County is one of the single member constituencies of the National Assembly, the national legislature of Hungary. The constituency standard abbreviation: Győr-Moson-Sopron 05. OEVK.

Since 2014, it has been represented by István Nagy of the Fidesz–KDNP party alliance.

Geography
The 5th constituency is located in northern part of Győr-Moson-Sopron County.

List of municipalities
The constituency includes the following municipalities:

Members
The constituency was first represented by István Nagy of the Fidesz from 2014, and he was re-elected in 2018 and 2022.

References

Győr-Moson-Sopron 5th